Seven Days to a Killing is a British spy novel by Clive Egleton, published in 1973. It was adapted to film as The Black Windmill in 1974, with Michael Caine as the lead. It concerns an MI6 officer whose son is kidnapped, and a ransom of $500,000 demanded.

1973 British novels
British novels adapted into films
British spy novels
Hodder & Stoughton books